Ancel is both a French surname and a given name. Notable people with the name include:

Surname:
Jacques Ancel (1879–1943), French geographer and geopolitician
Michel Ancel (born 1972), French video game designer

Given name:
Ancel Henry Bassett (1809–1886), American Methodist minister, writer, editor and historian
Ancel Keys (1904–2004), American scientist

French-language surnames